Alejandro Enrique Delgado Oscoy (born 26 May 1971) is a Mexican politician from the National Action Party. From 2006 to 2009 he served as Deputy of the LX Legislature of the Mexican Congress representing Querétaro, and previously served in the Congress of Querétaro from 2003 to 2006.

References

1971 births
Living people
People from Querétaro
National Action Party (Mexico) politicians
21st-century Mexican politicians
Deputies of the LX Legislature of Mexico
Members of the Chamber of Deputies (Mexico) for Querétaro
Members of the Congress of Querétaro
Querétaro University of Technology alumni